Rebecca "Beckie" Scott,  (born August 1, 1974) is a Canadian retired cross-country skier. She is Chair of the World Anti-Doping Agency (WADA) Athlete Committee, and served as an International Olympic Committee member by virtue of being elected to the IOC Athlete's Commission along with Saku Koivu between 2006 and 2014. She is married to the American former cross-country skier Justin Wadsworth.

Career

Scott was born in Vegreville, Alberta, but grew up in Vermilion, Alberta. Supported by her parents, she began cross-country skiing at the age of five. She entered her first competition at age seven and attended the Junior National Championships in 1988. She went on to win seventeen World Cup medals in sprint, individual
Scott is a three-time Olympian, participating at the 1998 Winter Olympic Games in Nagano, Japan, the 2002 Winter Olympic Games in Salt Lake City, Utah, and the 2006 Winter Olympic Games in Turin, Italy. Her best-placed finish in Nagano was 45th, but Scott won a gold medal in cross-country skiing at the Salt Lake City games. She originally finished third in the 5 km pursuit, but she was upgraded to the gold medal when winner Olga Danilova and runner-up Larissa Lazutina were eventually disqualified for using darbepoetin, a performance-enhancing drug. Scott was awarded a silver medal before receiving her gold medal in June 2004, almost two and a half years after the Olympics ended. She became the first Canadian and first North American woman to win an Olympic medal in cross-country skiing.

Scott is an Officer of the Order of Canada, and has been honoured with a variety of awards in Canada. She has been inducted into the Canadian Sports Hall of Fame, the Canadian Olympic Hall of Fame, the Canadian Ski Hall of Fame, and the Alberta Sports Hall of Fame. She has a Bachelor of Arts in English from the University of Waterloo. She holds honorary Doctorates of Laws from the University of Alberta  and the University of British Columbia. Scott was inducted into the Alberta Order of Excellence on October 17, 2019.

On March 29, 2005, Scott agreed to join the World Anti-Doping Agency's (WADA) athlete committee.

On February 23, 2006, Scott was elected as an athlete member of the International Olympic Committee along with Finnish ice hockey player Saku Koivu. Scott retired on April 12, 2006,  as the most decorated Canadian cross-country skier. 2006 was also her best season, with multiple victories and podiums on the World Cup circuit, to go with her Olympic silver in one of her races in Turin, and she lost out on winning her first World Cup overall season title to the great Marit Bjørgen by the smallest margin.

In September 2012 Scott was appointed to WADA's executive committee. In September 2018, Scott resigned from the WADA compliance and review committee responsible for making a recommendation to end the Russian Anti-Doping Agency's suspension from WADA.

Cross-country skiing results
All results are sourced from the International Ski Federation (FIS).

Olympic Games
 2 medals – (1 gold, 1 silver)

World Championships

a.  Cancelled due to extremely cold weather.

World Cup

Season standings

Individual podiums
 4 victories
 15 podiums

Team podiums

 2 podiums – (1 , 1 )

See also
 List of University of Waterloo people

References

External links

 
 
 
 
 
 
 

1974 births
Living people
Sportspeople from Bend, Oregon
Sportspeople from Alberta
Canadian female cross-country skiers
Olympic gold medalists for Canada
Olympic silver medalists for Canada
Cross-country skiers at the 1998 Winter Olympics
Cross-country skiers at the 2006 Winter Olympics
Cross-country skiers at the 2002 Winter Olympics
Officers of the Order of Canada
Recipients of the Meritorious Service Decoration
Olympic cross-country skiers of Canada
International Olympic Committee members
World Anti-Doping Agency members
Athabasca University alumni
Olympic medalists in cross-country skiing
Medalists at the 2006 Winter Olympics
Medalists at the 2002 Winter Olympics
People from Vegreville
Members of the Alberta Order of Excellence